Surveyor Lake is a lake in Nipissing District, Ontario, Canada, about  southwest of the community of Temagami.

The primary inflow, at the north of the lake, is the Temagami River from Cross Lake. Secondary inflows include three unnamed creeks, one at the east, one at the west, and one from the direction of Smith Lake at the northeast. The primary outflow, at the south and controlled by the Cross Lake Dam, is the Temagami River towards Red Cedar Lake.

See also
List of lakes in Ontario

References

Lakes of Nipissing District